The R480 road is a regional road in Ireland which links the N67 road with Leamaneh in County Clare.

A number of landmarks stand by the road, including Poulnabrone dolmen, Aillwee Cave and Leamaneh Castle.

See also 

 Roads in Ireland
 National primary road
 National secondary road

References 

Regional roads in the Republic of Ireland

Roads in County Clare